Paul Alo-Emile (born 22 December 1991) is a Samoan rugby union player. His regular playing position is prop. He plays for Stade Français Paris in the Top 14.

Career

Early playing
Alo-Emile is of Samoan heritage, born in New Zealand he grew up in Brisbane, and attended Brisbane State High School. In 2006 he joined the Australian Rugby Union's National Talent Squad, and represented the Australian Schoolboys. In 2009 was a member of the Queensland side that won the Australian Schools Rugby title. Alo-Emile also represented the state of Queensland in Gridiron (American Football).

He played for Sunnybank in the Queensland Premier Rugby competition.

In 2010 Alo-Emile joined the Australian under 20s. At the 2011 IRB Junior World Championship he played against England, France, New Zealand, Scotland, South Africa, and Tonga.

In November 2014, Alo-Emile and Stade Français Paris announced that he would join the Parisian team at the end of the Super Rugby season.

Super and ITM rugby
Alo-Emile was a member of the Western Force in 2011, but did not make any first-team appearances. He joined the Melbourne Rebels in 2012. At the end of the 2013 Super Rugby season he had 19 Super Rugby caps, and the Rebels released him to Waikato for the 2013 ITM Cup season.

International
On 23 August 2019, he was named in Samoa's 34-man training squad for the 2019 Rugby World Cup, before being named in the final 31 on 31 August.

Super Rugby statistics

References

External links
 
Rebels profile

1991 births
Australian rugby union players
Australian sportspeople of Samoan descent
Melbourne Rebels players
Melbourne Rising players
Western Force players
Waikato rugby union players
Rugby union props
New Zealand emigrants to Australia
Sportsmen from Queensland
People educated at Brisbane State High School
Living people
Rugby union players from Brisbane
Stade Français players
Expatriate rugby union players in France
Samoa international rugby union players
Samoan rugby union players